Stephen, Steven or Steve Gordon may refer to:

Stephen J. Gordon (born 1986), English chess grandmaster 
Steve Gordon (cricketer) (born 1967), Cayman Islands cricketer
Steve Gordon (Jamaican cricketer) (born 1970), Jamaican cricketer
Steve Gordon (director) (1938–1982), American film and television director
Steve Gordon (rugby league) (born 1986), rugby league footballer
Steven E. Gordon (born 1960), director, character designer and animator
Stephen Gordon, the protagonist of The Well of Loneliness, a 1928 novel by Radclyffe Hall
Stephen Samuel Gordon (1970–2014), British MC known as The Spaceape
Steve Gordon (rugby union) (born 1967), New Zealand rugby union player
Steven Dean Gordon (born 1969), American serial killer